The 2010–11 Malian Première Division is the 46th season of the highest level of professional football in Mali. The championship is once again contested by 14 teams between December 2010 and September 2011. The defending champions are Stade Malien (Bamako).

Teams
AS Sigui and Stade Malien de Sikasso were relegated at the end of last season after finishing in the bottom two places of the table. The relegated teams were replaced by the champions of the two Malian second-level league groups, AS Bamako and CAS de Sévaré.

League table

References

Mali
Malian Première Division seasons
football
football